Royston Island (also known as North Island) is an island in the Australian state of South Australia at the northern end of Pondalowie Bay on the south-west extremity of Yorke Peninsula about  north-west of the town of Stenhouse Bay.  The island has enjoyed protected area status since 1967 and since 1972, it has been part of the Innes National Park.

Description
The island is connected to Royston Head by a “shallow, partially drying reef.”  Access to the island is reported as being “probably most accessible by small boat via the north-eastern coast.”

Formation, geology and oceanography
Royston Island was formed about 7000 years ago following the rise of sea levels at the start of the Holocene.

Flora and fauna

Flora
A survey carried out during 1982 on Royston Island recorded a total of nineteen plant species.  The island's summit is dominated by a “low, windswept shrubland” consisting of marsh saltbush and coast daisy-bush accompanied by less abundant species such as southern sea-heath, round-leaved pigface and pointed twinleaf.  The talus slopes support shrubs of nitre-bush, native juniper, cockies tongue, African boxthorn, yellow-flowering sticky goodenia, Austral stork's bill, coastal lignum and ruby saltbush, while calcrete ledges associated with the island's upper levels are “festooned with climbing bower spinach.”

Fauna
Vertebrate animals are represented by birds and reptiles.  As of 1982, little penguins were observed as being the common bird on the island followed by silver gulls.  Both bird species used the island as a breeding colony.  As of 2011, the status of the little penguin colony was not known.  Also in 1982, the island is reported as supporting a “large population of marbled geckos.”

History

European discovery and use
Royston Island is reported as being named after Lord Royston, eldest son of Lord Hardwicke by Matthew Flinders in 1802.  The island is also known as “North Island”.

Protected areas status

Royston Island first received protected area status along with Middle Island in Pondalowie Bay as a fauna conservation reserve declared under the Crown Lands Act 1929-1966 on 16 March 1967.  Since 1972, it has been part of the Innes National Park.  Since 2012, the waters adjoining the shoreline of Royston Island have been within a habitat protection zone in the South Spencer Gulf Marine Park.  Since at least 2014, Royston Island and the other two islands in Pondalowie Bay (from north to south), Middle Island and South South Island, are closed to access by visitors to the national park. Penguin breeding sites were noted there in a 1996 survey of South Australia's offshore islands.

See also
List of islands of Australia
List of little penguin colonies

Citations and references

Citations

References
	

	

	

Islands of South Australia
Uninhabited islands of Australia
Spencer Gulf
Yorke Peninsula
Penguin colonies